Quyang Township is a township-level division of Zhengding County, Shijiazhuang, Hebei, China.

See also
List of township-level divisions of Hebei

References

Township-level divisions of Hebei